NagaWorld Football Club (founded in 2001 as NagaCorp FC) is a Cambodian professional football club based in Kampong Speu province. NagaWorld clinched its third Cambodian championship with a week to spare on 23 September 2018, having also won the Kingdom's top tier title in 2007 and 2009. NagaWorld FC also won the Samdech Hun Sen Cup in 2013.

Players

Players with multiple nationalities 
 Dav Nim
 Lim Aarun Raymond
 Seng Saravuthy

Record

Continental

Invitational tournament

Domestic
C-League
Champions (3): 2007, 2009, 2018

Hun Sen Cup
Winners (1): 2013

Head coaches
Coaches by Years

Captains
Captain by Years

References

Football clubs in Cambodia
2001 establishments in Cambodia